Mecomodica fullawayi is a fungus moth (family Tineidae) of the subfamily Erechthiinae. It was first described by Otto Swezey in 1926.

It is provisionally separated in the monotypic genus Mecomodica, described by Elwood Zimmerman in 1978, but it may belong in the related larger genera Comodica or Erechthias.

It is only known from Kure Island in the Pacific Ocean. Adults are small and mostly yellow.

External links

Global Taxonomic Database of Tineidae
  (2010): Australian Faunal Directory – Erechthias. Version of November 15, 2010. Retrieved December 23, 2011.

Tineidae
Endemic moths of Hawaii
Moths described in 1926